VD Sharma also known as Vishnu Datt Sharma (born 1 October 1970) is an Indian politician and member of the 17th Lok Sabha, representing Khajuraho constituency, Madhya Pradesh. He is a member of the Bharatiya Janata Party and BJP President in the state of Madhya Pradesh.

References 

India MPs 2019–present
Lok Sabha members from Madhya Pradesh
Living people
Bharatiya Janata Party politicians from Madhya Pradesh
1970 births